Events from the year 1786 in art.

Events
 November – Boydell Shakespeare Gallery inaugurated in London.
 Francisco Goya is appointed court painter to King Charles III of Spain.

Works

 Mather Brown – Portraits of Thomas Jefferson and Charles Bulfinch
 Thomas Gainsborough – Lavinia (The Milk Maid)
 Ozias Humphry – Portrait of Hyder Beg Khan
 Louise Élisabeth Vigée Le Brun
 Mademoiselle Sophie
 Self-portrait in a Turban with Julie
 Jean-Laurent Mosnier – Self-portrait
 Joshua Reynolds
 Admiral Sir Edward Hughes
 Dr. John Hunter seated in his museum
 John Trumbull
 The Death of General Warren at the Battle of Bunker's Hill, June 17, 1775
 The Death of General Montgomery in the Attack on Quebec, December 31, 1775
 Johann Zoffany – Colonel Antoine Polier, Claud Martin and John Wombwell with the Artist

Births
 January 26 – Benjamin Haydon, English historical painter and writer (suicide 1846)
 April 1 – William Mulready, Irish genre painter of rural scenes (died 1863)
 April 16 – Albrecht Adam, painter (died 1862)
 June 3 – Kim Jeong-hui, calligrapher, epigraphist, and scholar of Korea's later Joseon period (died 1856)
 July 5 – Charles Alfred Stothard, historical draughtsman (died 1821)
 July 9 – Rudolph Schadow, German sculptor (died 1822)
 August 8 – Bengt Erland Fogelberg, Swedish sculptor (died 1854)
 August 28 – Ferdinand Piloty, lithographer (died 1844)
 September 28 – Johann Michael Sattler, Austrian portrait and landscape painter (died 1847)
 October 10 – François-Édouard Picot, French historic painter (died 1868)
 November 23 – František Tkadlík, Czech painter (died 1840)
 date unknown
 Jean Alaux, French history painter and Director of the French Academy in Rome (died 1864)
 Julien-Honoré-Germain d'Aubuisson, French portrait and miniature painter (died 1860)
 Georgije Bakalović, Serbian painter (died 1843)
 Eugénie Honorée Marguerite Charen, French painter (died 1824)
 Jean Augustin Daiwaille, Dutch portrait painter (died 1850)
 William Derby, English miniature painter and copyist (died 1847)
 John Fischer, German portrait, miniature, and landscape painter (died 1875)
 James Frothingham, American painter (died 1864)
 Kunisada, Japanese designer of ukiyo-e woodblock prints (died 1865)
 Abraham Wivell, British portrait painter, writer and pioneer of fire protection (died 1849)
 probable
John Hayes, British portrait-painter (died 1866)

Deaths
 January 8 – Johan Edvard Mandelberg, Swedish-born painter (born 1730)
 January 12 – Claude-Henri Watelet, French fermier-général, amateur painter and writer on the arts (born 1718)
 February 6 – Samuel Wale, English historical painter and book illustrator (born unknown)
 February 17 – Thomas Beckwith, English painter, genealogist and antiquary (born 1731)
 March 6 – Charles Germain de Saint Aubin, draftsman and embroidery designer to King Louis XV of France (born 1721)
 March 18 – Jacob Bonneau, Anglo-French painter (date of birth unknown)
 April 12 – Francesco Saverio Mergalo, Italian portrait painter (born 1746)
 April 23 – Alexander Cozens, British landscape-painter in water-colours and teacher of painting (born 1717)
 May 4 – Johann Kaspar Füssli, Swiss painter (born 1743)
 June 21 – George Hepplewhite, English furniture designer (born 1727?)
 July 14 – John Collier, English caricaturist and satirist (born 1708)
 October 17 – Johann Ludwig Aberli, Swiss landscape painter and etcher (born 1723)
 October 30 – William Duesbury, British enameller and entrepreneur (born 1725)
 date unknown
 Andrea-Salvatore Aglio, Italian sculptor and painter on marble (born 1736)
 Johann Karl Auerbach, Austrian painter (born 1723)
 Tilly Kettle, portrait painter (born 1735)

References

 
Years of the 18th century in art
1780s in art